A list of football teams in Syria in the top division.

 Abu Hardub SC
 Afrin
 Ommal Aleppo
 Amuda SC
 Al-Arabi SC (Syria)
 Arihah SC
 Al-Bab SC
 Baniyas Refinery
 Barada SC
 Bathrobe Dwane SC
 Abu Kamal SC
 Al-Bariqa
 Darayya SC
 Douma SC
 Jalaa
 Al-Jihad
 Al-Fayhaa SC
 Al-Forat Raqqah
 Al-Fotuwa
 Al-Herafyeen SC
 Al-Horgelah
 Hurriya
 Hutteen
 Al-Ittihad
 Jableh
 Jayrud
 Al-Jaish
 Jaramana
 Al-Jazeera
 Jisr al-Shughur SC
 Al-Karamah
 Al-Khabur SC
 Al-Kiswah
 Maarat al-Numaan SC
 Al-Majd
 Manbij SC
 Mayadin SC
 Morek SC
 Al-Muhafaza 
 Muadamiyat al-Sham
 Al-Nasr Quneitra
 Nawair
 Al-Nidal
 Al-Nabek
 Omayya
 Orouba
 Qamhana
 Qardaha SC
 Qasioun SC
 Ommal Hama SC
 Ommal Rmelan
 Al-Sahel
 Salamiyah
 Saraqib SC
 Al-Shabab SC (Syria)
 Shahbaa SC Aleppo
 Shahba
 Al-Shouleh SC (Syria)
 Al-Shurta
 Shorta Aleppo
 Shorta Hama
 Tadamon SC (Syria)
 Taliya
 Tafas SC
 Tishreen
 Al-Wahda
 Al-Wathba
 Al-Yaqdhah SC
 Al-Yarmouk

    
Syria
Football clubs
Football clubs